North Branch is a locality in the Toowoomba Region, Queensland, Australia.

Geography
The Condamine River forms part of the locality's south-east border with Felton South before crossing the locality towards the west where it splits into two branches. The southern branch remains known as the Condamine River and the northern branch is known as the Condamine River (north branch) and is presumably the origin of the locality name.

History 
In 1877,  of land was resumed from the North Branch pastoral run; it was offer for selection on 17 April 1877.

North Branch State School  opened circa 1878 and closed in 1903. It reopened in 1926, possibly at a new location. It closed on 3 November 1958. In 1946, the school was at 55 Kincora Road.

References

Toowoomba Region
Localities in Queensland